Peppino Vallone (born 9 January 1949 in Petilia Policastro) is an Italian politician.

He was elected Mayor of Crotone leading a centre-left coalition at the 2006 Italian local elections, and took office on 13 June 2006. He ran for a second term at the 2011 local elections and was re-confirmed on 1 June 2011.

Vallone also served as President of the Province of Crotone from October 2014 to January 2017.

See also
2006 Italian local elections
2011 Italian local elections
List of mayors of Crotone

References

External links
 

1949 births
Living people
Mayors of Crotone
Presidents of the Province of Crotone
Democratic Party (Italy) politicians
Democracy is Freedom – The Daisy politicians